Getachew Abate (1895–1952) was an army commander and a member of the nobility of the Ethiopian Empire.

Getachew Abate was the son of Lique Mekwas Abate Ba-Yalew.  He had a church education followed by language training at the Menelik School (Ecole Imperiale Menelik II).  Getachew Abate grew up in the palace of Emperor Menelik II along with Menelik's grandson, Lij Iyasu.

In 1919, Dejazmach Getachew Abate was sent to Italy to congratulate King Victor Emmanuel on an Allied victory.  In 1921, he was part of the force sent to capture the deposed Lij Iyasu.  In 1925, Getachew Abate represented Ethiopia at the Geneva arms conference.

In 1926, Getachew Abate was named Shum of Kaffa, Goldiya, Maji, and Gera with the title of Bitwoded.  In 1928, he was named Ethiopia's representative to the League of Nations.  In 1929, Getachew Abate was appointed as Minister to France.

In 1930, Getachew Abate returned to Ethiopia and, in 1931, he became the Minister of the Interior.  In May 1933, Getachew Abate was elevated to Ras

In 1935, at the time of the Italian invasion, as the Shum of Kaffa Province, Ras Getachew Abate commanded the Army of Kaffa.  On 31 March 1936, Ras Getachew Abate and the Army of Kaffa was with Emperor Haile Selassie at the Battle of Maychew.  When the Kebur Zabagna (the Ethiopian imperial guard) was sent against the Italians at Maychew, Getachew Abate commanded them.  As the Battle of Maychew came to an end, Getachew Abate was named by the Emperor as Asmach.  In command of the rear guard, he withdrew with the Emperor from Maychew to the Ethiopian capital, Addis Ababa.

As the Italians closed in on Addis Ababa, he went into exile with Haile Selassie.  Getachew Abate departed from the royal party as it traveled through the British Mandate of Palestine.  Getachew Abate then spent some time in Jerusalem.  But ultimately he returned to occupied Ethiopia and submitted to the Italians.

In 1941, after the Italians were driven out of Ethiopia, Ras Getachew Abate was arrested by the liberators.  In an act of clemency, Haile Selassie told him "I forgive you, but I do not know if God will."  Afterwards, Getachew Abate was exiled to remote parts of the Empire, Jimma and Arsi.  He is said to have died of alcohol poisoning.

See also
 Ethiopian aristocratic and court titles

Notes 
Footnotes

Citations

References 
 
 

 

1895 births
1952 deaths
Ethiopian nobility
Ethiopian military personnel
Ethiopian collaborators with Fascist Italy
20th-century Ethiopian people